Çoğlu is a village in the central district (Karaman) of Karaman Province, Turkey. It is situated to the east of Karadağ, an extinct volcano. The population of the village was 754 as of 2011. The village was founded in 1748 by Turkmens as a caravan stop on the road to Mecca for pilgrimage. It was also a market town, and the name Çoğlu (roughly meaning "many people") refers to crowd in the market days. The main economic activity is agriculture. Cereals are the main products. Sugar beet is also produced. Since there is no river nearby, the irrigation water is supplied by pumping. Animal breeding, especially ovine breeding, is a secondary activity.

References

Villages in Karaman Central District